Bolwarry, New South Wales is a civil parish of Tongowoko County, New South wales. The parish is east of Tibooburra.

Located at 29°23'50.0"S 142°20'04.0"E, the parish is east of Tibooburra, and within the traditional lands of Yarli peoples. The landscape is flat and arid scrubland.

Geography

The topography of the parish is flat and arid with a Köppen climate classification of BWh (Hot semi arid). The economy in the parish is based on broad acre agriculture, mainly cattle, and sheep. There are no towns in the parish and the nearest settlement is Tibooburra, New South Wales.

Narriearra Caryapundy Swamp National Park  is within the parish.

History
The parish is on the traditional land of the Karrengappa people. The first Europeans through the area were Burke and Wills with Charles Sturt passing to the west.

the expansion of pastoralist in the second half of the 19th century saw the parish incorporated into the Caryapundy Station. In 1873 the area was described as being of [the] Burke and Wills track and well watered by the Bulloo River, Tongowoko, Torrens and other creeks. At the time the area was made up of grassed downs and saltbush country.

By 1892 the Caryapundy Station was in the hands of Sidney Kidman who moved 10,000 sheep and 1,000 head of cattle from the station, still owned by the Kidman Brothers in 1899, Sidney Kidman described it as one of the worst in New South Wales, the  might carry 230 cattle but no more, much of it is a claypan that will never carry feed.

In the 1890s it was included in the Albert Goldfields.

The path of totality for the 25 November 2030 solar eclipse will pass over the parish.

References

Parishes of Tongowoko County
Far West (New South Wales)